Killers Anonymous is a 2019 American crime thriller film, directed by Martin Owen, from a screenplay by Owen, Elizabeth Morris and Seth Johnson. It stars Tommy Flanagan, Rhyon Nicole Brown, Jessica Alba, Gary Oldman, MyAnna Buring, Michael Socha, Tim McInnerny and Sam Hazeldine. It was released on June 28, 2019, by Lionsgate.

Cast

Production
In June 2018, it was announced Gary Oldman, Jessica Alba, Tommy Flanagan, Rhyon Nicole Brown, MyAnna Buring, Michael Socha, Tim McInnerny, Sam Hazeldine, Elizabeth Morris, Elliott James Langridge, Isabelle Allen and Suki Waterhouse had joined the cast of the film, with Martin Owen directing from a screenplay by Morris, Owen and Seth Johnson.

Release
In October 2018, Lionsgate and Grindstone Entertainment Group acquired distribution rights to the film. It was released theatrically in the United States on June 28, 2019. The movie holds a 0% rating approval on Rotten Tomatoes based on 9 reviews.

Box office
Killers Anonymous grossed $0 in the United States and Canada, and $100,581 in other territories.

References

External links
 
 

2019 films
American crime thriller films
2019 crime thriller films
Lionsgate films
2010s English-language films
2010s American films